Nazir Stackhouse is an American football defensive tackle who currently plays for the Georgia Bulldogs.

Early life and high school
Stackhouse grew up in Stone Mountain, Georgia and attended Columbia High School. Stackhouse was rated a four-star recruit and committed to play college football at Georgia as a sophomore.

College career
Stackhouse joined the Georgia Bulldogs as an early enrollee and played in six games during his freshman season. He played in ten games as a reserve defensive lineman during Georgia's national championship season in 2021 and finished the year with nine tackles, two tackles for loss, and one sack. Stackhouse entered his junior season as a starter at defensive tackle. He was named second-team All-Southeastern Conference at the end of the regular season.

References

External links
Georgia Bulldogs bio

Living people
American football defensive tackles
Players of American football from Georgia (U.S. state)
Georgia Bulldogs football players
Year of birth missing (living people)